Kang Ryong-woon (born 25 April 1942) is a North Korean football forward who played for North Korea in the 1966 FIFA World Cup. He also played for Rodongja Sports Club.

References

1942 births
North Korean footballers
North Korea international footballers
Association football forwards
1966 FIFA World Cup players
Living people
Rodongja Sports Club players